Auburndale is a community in the Canadian province of Nova Scotia, located in the Lunenburg Municipal District in Lunenburg County. Located approximately 1.5 km northwest of Bridgewater, Nova Scotia, Auburndale was formerly named Branch.

References
Auburndale on Destination Nova Scotia

Communities in Lunenburg County, Nova Scotia